The 1975–76 Scottish First Division season was the first season in which the Scottish First Division became the second tier of Scottish football and the number of teams was reduced from 20 to 14. The season was won by Partick Thistle, who were promoted along with Kilmarnock to  the Premier Division. Dunfermline Athletic and Clyde were relegated to the Second Division.

Table

References

Scottish First Division seasons
2
Scot